Alberto Abel Mestre Vivas (born 10 February 1999) is a Venezuelan swimmer. He competed in the men's 100 metre freestyle at the 2020 Summer Olympics.

References

External links
 

1999 births
Living people
Venezuelan male swimmers
Venezuelan male freestyle swimmers
Olympic swimmers of Venezuela
Swimmers at the 2020 Summer Olympics
Place of birth missing (living people)
20th-century Venezuelan people
21st-century Venezuelan people
Competitors at the 2022 South American Games